Black Mountain Golf Club is a championship golf course located ten kilometers west of the city of Hua Hin, Thailand. Recognized as one of the best in Thailand and Asia-Pacific, it has hosted the Black Mountain Masters and the International Series Thailand on the Asian Tour, as well as the True Thailand Classic, co-sanctioned by the European Tour.

History
The club was founded by Swedish entrepreneur Stig Notlöv in 2005. Notlöv was born in Pajala and founded , a chain of 200 home improvement stores, which he sold to invest in the course in Hua Hin. The original 18 holes opened on 20 April 2007, and in 2016 another 9 holes, the West course, were added.

Numerous awards followed rapidly. In 2011, Black Mountain was named the best course in Thailand and the best championship course in Asia-Pacific by the Asian Golf Monthly. 

In 2012, Black Mountain became the first course in Thailand to be included in US Golf Digest's list of the Best 100 Courses Outside the United States.

Tournaments hosted
The club has hosted several Asian Tour events as well as events co-sanctioned by the European Tour.

Professional tournaments

See also
Golf in Thailand

References

External links

Golf clubs and courses in Thailand
Buildings and structures in Prachuap Khiri Khan province